McKinney is a city in Collin County, Texas, United States.

McKinney may also refer to:

People
McKinney (surname)
Collin McKinney

Places
In the United States:
McKinney Acres, Texas, census-designated place in Andrews County
McKinney Falls State Park, Austin, Texas
McKinney Homestead, Austin, Texas

Other uses
McKinney (advertising agency), a Durham, North Carolina-based advertising agency
McKinney (horse)
McKinney's, a legal publishing brand owned by West

See also

 McKinnie (surname)
 
 
 
 Kinnie (disambiguation)
 Kinney (disambiguation)